Austroplatypus is a genus of weevils native to Australia that includes Austroplatypus incompertus, the first beetle to be recognized as a eusocial insect. Members of the genus live in eucalypt trees and their fungal galleries can persist for decades because the host tree is not being killed.

References 

Platypodinae